Matthew Yeats (born April 6, 1979) is a Canadian former  professional ice hockey goaltender. He played five National Hockey League (NHL) games with the Washington Capitals.

Playing career
Originally drafted by the Los Angeles Kings in the 1998 NHL Entry Draft, Yeats was signed in 2003 as a free agent by the Portland Pirates, and then later the Washington Capitals, he played five games for the Capitals near the end of the 2003–04 NHL season.

The Norwegian team Sparta Warriors in Sarpsborg, Norway announced Yeats as their new goalie for the 07/08 season in the Get League on April 28, 2007, he left the team from Sarpsborg on 28 October 2008 and moved to Herlev Hornets. He left after 3 months Denmark and joined on 1 February 2009 to Slovenian club HK Acroni Jesenice of the Erste Bank Hockey League. He left the team after the end of season.

Teams
95/96:	Lethbridge Hurricanes (WHL)
96-98:	Olds Grizzlys	(AJHL)		
99-02:	University of Maine	(NCAA)	
02:	Philadelphia Phantoms	(AHL)	
03:	Atlantic City Boardwalk Bullies	(ECHL)	
03	Washington Capitals	(NHL)	
04:	Portland Pirates	(ECHL)	
04:	Reading Royals	(ECHL)	
05-06	Idaho Steelheads	(ECHL)	
06-07	Texas Wildcatters	(ECHL)	
07-08	Sparta Warriors	(Eliteserien)	
08-09	Herlev Hornets	(AL-Bank Ligaen)
09-09  HK Acroni Jesenice  (Erste Bank Hockey League)

References

External links

Player Profile
Texas Wildcatter's Yeats Video

1979 births
Atlantic City Boardwalk Bullies players
Canadian ice hockey goaltenders
HK Acroni Jesenice players
Ice hockey people from Alberta
Idaho Steelheads (ECHL) players
Lethbridge Hurricanes players
Living people
Los Angeles Kings draft picks
Maine Black Bears men's ice hockey players
Philadelphia Phantoms players
Portland Pirates players
Reading Royals players
Texas Wildcatters players
Washington Capitals players
Canadian expatriate ice hockey players in Slovenia
People from Innisfail, Alberta